Since the AFC Asian Cup was founded in 1956, India has qualified for five Asian Cups, in 1964, 1984, 2011, 2019 and 2023.

The team played their first Asian Cup in 1964. It was India's best finish in the continental competition which came 55 years ago when they finished runners-up. In 1964, India gained a direct qualification to the finals of the tournament after several Western Zone teams pulled out due to political reasons. 14 years after the country missed out on FIFA World Cup participation, the India national team had earned the opportunity to take centre stage in Asian football under English coach Harry Wright. Played in a round-robin format, the 1964 edition of the Asian Cup was won by hosts Israel but it had only four participants - one team from each zone. And with wins over South Korea and Hong Kong, India cemented second place. Inder Singh became team's top scorer with two goals.

The team had to wait 20 years to qualify for the finals again. And when they did, a group stage disaster awaited the Men in Blue. The 10 participants were divided into two groups of five and India were placed in Group B alongside China PR, Iran, UAE and hosts Singapore. India lost three games and held Iran to a goalless draw to come away with a just a point in 1984. Saudi Arabia clinched their first Asian title, defeating China PR in the final. The legendary Krishanu Dey was part of Serbian coach Milovan Ćirić's India national team that battled it out with heavyweights like China PR and Iran.

The 2011 AFC Asian Cup in Qatar marked India's third and most recent continental campaign. The Blues qualified on the virtue of being the winners of the 2008 AFC Challenge Cup. A Sunil Chhetri hat-trick and a goal by Bhaichung Bhutia helped hosts India defeat Tajikistan in the final of the Challenge Cup and qualify for the Asian Cup for the first time in 27 years. Drawn into Group C from Pot 4, the Blues lost all three of their group games to get dumped out of the tournament without any points on the board. Tim Cahill's brace helped Australia register a 4–0 win against India in the group opener. Gouramangi Singh and Chhetri scored in either half as India lost 2–5 to Bahrain and Chhetri's first-half spot-kick was the team's only consolation as South Korea thrashed them 1–4 in the final game in Group C.

Eight years later, India national team qualified and was set to travel to UAE for the 2019 AFC Asian Cup under head coach Stephen Constantine. The team won their opening match against Thailand with the help of Sunil Chhetri's brace and broke the 55 years winless drought. However, India lost two remaining matches and crashed out from the group stage for the third consecutive participation.

Record

1964 AFC Asian Cup

1984 AFC Asian Cup

Group B

2011 AFC Asian Cup

Group C

2019 AFC Asian Cup

Group A

2023 AFC Asian Cup

India qualified by finishing as group D winners in third round. This marked India's first ever consecutive Asian Cup qualification.

Record by Opponent

Goalscorers

See also 

History of the India national football team
India national football team at the Olympics
India national football team at the FIFA World Cup qualification

References

 
Countries at the AFC Asian Cup
India national football team